María Luisa Pagán (also spelled as Maria Pagan) is an American attorney who is serving as the U.S. deputy trade representative in the Geneva office. Pagan was formerly the Deputy General Counsel of the Office of the United States Trade Representative (USTR), giving legal advice about trade negotiations, agreements, and regulations.

Biography 
Born in Puerto Rico, Pagán received her bachelor's degree from Tufts University and a master's degree and Juris Doctor from Georgetown University. After being a legal adviser at the U.S. Department of Commerce from 1993 to 2003, Pagán has been working at the USTR. She had a leading role in several trade negotiation teams.

During the transition from the Obama to the Trump governments, she served as the acting United States Trade Representative. On January 20, 2021, she once again assumed the position of acting United States Trade Representative. In August 2021, President Joe Biden appointed her to serve as Envoy to the World Trade Organization (WTO).

Nomination for Trade Representative
Pagan was nominated by President Biden on August 10, 2021. Hearings were held on Pagan's nomination by the Senate's Finance Committee on October 26, 2021. The committee reported the nomination favorably to the Senate floor on November 17, 2021 by a 27-1 vote with Senator James Lankford voted no. On March 10, 2022, the Senate confirmed Pagan to be the next U.S trade representative in Geneva, Switzerland by a vote of 80-19.

References 

|-

Biden administration cabinet members
Georgetown University alumni
Living people
Trump administration cabinet members
Tufts University alumni
United States Trade Representatives
Year of birth missing (living people)